The Malta Sailing Federation is the national governing body for the sport of sailing in Malta, recognised by the International Sailing Federation.

History
In 1975 the Royal Malta Yacht Club instigated the formation of the Malta Yachting Federation with a view to such body assuming the recognition, at the time accorded to the club by the Malta Government (National Sports Board), as the National Authority and controlling body for yachting in Malta.

Famous Sailors
See :Category:Maltese sailors

Olympic sailing
See :Category:Olympic sailors of Malta

Yacht Clubs
See :Category:Yacht clubs in Malta

References

External links
 Royal Malta Yacht Club

Sports organizations established in 1975
Malta
Sailing
1975 establishments in Malta